

Academia

Arts
Maurice Berger – research professor and chief curator of the Center for Art, Design and Visual Culture
Jason Burik – Lego artist
Irene Chan – artist and architect
 Tim Finin – author, conference organizer
 Mantle Hood –  ethnomusicologist
 Kevin Kallaugher – artist-in-residence, cartoonist for The Baltimore Sun
Kathy O'Dell –  art historian
 Stuart Saunders Smith – percussionist and composer
 William H. Thomas – researcher of geriatric medicine and elder care
 Stan Vanderbeek – experimental filmmaker
 Fred Worden – filmmaker involved in experimental cinema

Anthropology
 Robert A. Rubinstein – cultural anthropologist

Chemistry
 Ramachandra S. Hosmane – organic chemist

Education 

 Mavis Sanders, professor of education and from 2017-2021 director of Sherman Center for Early Learning in Urban Communities

Engineering
 Keith Bowman – materials scientist and dean of the UMBC College of Engineering and Information Technology

English
 Gloria Oden – Pulitzer Prize-nominated poet

Gender and women's studies
 Anne Brodsky – Director of the Gender and Women's Studies Program
 Carole McCann – researches reproductive politics, cultural politics of gender, sexuality, race and science, and U.S. women's history

Geography and environmental systems
 Erle Ellis – ecologist studying human-environmental changes

History
Kate Brown – 2009 Guggenheim Fellow
Warren I. Cohen – diplomatic historian, Sinologist, former president of the Society for Historians of American Foreign Relations

Health sciences
 Anthony M. Johnson – Deputy Director of the Mid-InfraRed Technologies for Health and the Environment project 
 Alan Sherman – chess team faculty advisor
William H. Thomas – Physician and professor at the UMBC Erickson School of Aging and creator of the Senior Emergency Department

Information technology
 Tülay Adalı –  Distinguished University Professor of Computer Science and Electrical Engineering 
 Tim Finin – computer scientist
 Anupam Joshi – expert in computer security 
 Samuel J. Lomonaco Jr. – computer scientist and mathematician 
 Andrew Sears – computer scientist focused on issues related to human-computer interaction 
 Alan Sherman – computer scientist

Journalism
 Christopher Corbett – former news editor and reporter with the Associated Press

Law
 Rabia Chaudry – attorney for Adnan Syed

Mathematics
 Manil Suri – mathematician and writer of a trilogy of novels

Psychology
 Stephen E. Braude – parapsychologist and temporal logic researcher
 Ellen Handler Spitz – writer and researcher on psychology, children, and the arts

Physics
 Chen Yung-Jui – fellow of Optical Society of America and Photonics Society of Chinese Americans
 Anthony M. Johnson – ultra-fast nonlinear optics
 Valerie Thomas – scientist and inventor
 Sebastian Deffner – quantum thermodynamics

Political science
 Mary Pat Clarke – member of the Baltimore City Council
 Thomas Schaller – talk show host and political commentator
 Adam Yarmolinsky – academic, educator, author

Alumni

Arts and entertainment

Stavros Halkias – stand-up comedian, podcaster, and co-creator of the Cum Town podcast
Dean Alexander – photographer based in Baltimore
Mario Armstrong – radio and television talk show host
Brian Dannelly – director of Saved! and the series Weeds
Shari Elliker – talk show host and radio personality
Steven Fischer – filmmaker
Tony Harris – news anchor for Al Jazeera English and Discovery Communications
Robert Mugge – documentary filmmaker
Jeremy Penn – artist, painter
 Johnathon Schaech – actor
 Hadieh Shafie – contemporary visual artist
 Kathleen Turner – Academy Award-nominated actress
Matthew VanDyke – documentary filmmaker, revolutionary, and former journalist
Sherry Vine – Project Runway star
Peter K. Wood – professional magician and illusionist
Brian Shannon - Graphic Designer

Music
Lafayette Gilchrist – jazz pianist
Andy Stack – founding member of the band Wye Oak

Business

Serge Mayifuila – owns congoglobal.com
Drew Westervelt – creator of Hex Performance; NLL attack for the Colorado Mammoth; Major League Lacrosse attack for the Chesapeake Bayhawks Associated Black Charities; former board member of the Baltimore City Public Schools

Chess
Pascal Charbonneau – Canadian Grandmaster
Greg Shahade - chess International Master, founded the United States Chess League
Tal Shaked – chess Grandmaster

Culinary

Duff Goldman – chef, owner of Charm City Cakes, star of the show Ace of Cakes
Geof Manthorne – cake decorator, star of the show Ace of Cakes

Literature 
 Bassey Ikpi – spoken-word poet, writer, and mental health advocate

Education

James P. Clements – 15th president of Clemson University and 23rd president of West Virginia University

Government and politics

Samuel Ankama – Namibian politician, traditional leader, and educator
Gail H. Bates – member of the Maryland House of Delegates
Jon S. Cardin – former member of the Maryland House of Delegates
Thomas E. Dewberry (born 1951) – judge and member of the Maryland House of Delegates
Ron Dillon, Jr. – politician and former Chairman of the County Council of Anne Arundel County, Maryland
Mark Doms – Under Secretary of Commerce for Economic Affairs for the United States Department of Commerce
Adrienne A. Jones – first African-American female to serve as Speaker Pro Tem in the Maryland House of Delegates
Allan Kittleman – county executive of Howard County, Maryland, and former senate minority whip
Ari Ne'eman – member of the National Council on Disability (Presidential-appointed position) and disability rights advocate
Dan Patrick – Lieutenant Governor of Texas
Victoria L. Schade – former member of the Maryland House of Delegates
Paul W. Comfort – Head of the Maryland Transit Administration

Medicine
Jerome Adams – Surgeon General of the United States 
Sylvia Trent-Adams – Surgeon General of the United States 
Diana West – author and lactation consultant
Blair Grubb- Professor of Medicine and researcher on Postural Tachycardia Syndrome
Kizzmekia Corbett - viral immunologist at the Vaccine Research Center (VRC) at the National Institute of Allergy and Infectious Diseases.

Social Sciences
Anna Gifty Opoku-Agyeman - writer, activist, economist; co-founder of The Sadie Collective and Black Birders Week.

Technology
Sean Carton – head of the Center for Digital Communication, Culture, and Commerce at the University of Baltimore
Tamara G. Kolda – applied mathematician and Distinguished Technical Staff at Sandia National Laboratories
Joseph Reagle – academic and author focused on technology and Wikipedia
Ralph Semmel – computer scientist and the eighth director of the Johns Hopkins University Applied Physics Laboratory

Sports

Baseball

Zach Clark – pitcher for the Baltimore Orioles
Wayne Franklin – retired pitcher for the Houston Astros (2000–2001), Milwaukee Brewers (2002–2003), San Francisco Giants (2004), New York Yankees (2005), and Atlanta Braves (2006)
Bob Mumma – UMBC's baseball coach
Jay Witasick – professional baseball pitcher in Major League Baseball 1996–2007

Basketball
Jairus Lyles – Point guard for Utah Jazz (2018 – current)

Equestrian
Lawrence W. Jennings – Thoroughbred racehorse trainer

Mountain biking
Marla Streb – professional mountain bike racer

Lacrosse
Dan Marohl – National Lacrosse League (NLL) forward for the Philadelphia Wings
Steve Marohl – NLL forward for the Baltimore Thunder and the Pittsburgh Crossefire; Major League Lacrosse (MLL) attack for the Baltimore Bayhawks
Brendan Mundorf – NLL forward for the New York Titans; MLL forward for the Denver Outlaws
Peet Poillon – Professional lacrosse player for the Chesapeake Bayhawks
Jeff Ratcliffe – NLL forward for the New York Titans
Drew Westervelt – Professional lacrosse player for the Colorado Mammoth

Soccer
Pete Caringi – professional soccer player, played for the Oklahoma City Energy and Baltimore Bohemians
Kadeem Dacres – professional soccer player, played for Louisville City FC
Kevin Gnatiko – professional soccer player, played for Crystal Palace Baltimore
Levi Houapeu – professional soccer player, played for Rochester Rhinos
Brian Rowland – Canadian professional indoor-soccer player; played for the Canada men's national soccer team
Matt Watson – professional soccer player, played for the Chicago Fire Soccer Club
Steve Zerhusen – goalkeeper for the North American Soccer League
Sammy Kahsai – professional soccer player, played as a midfielder for Maryland Bobcats FC

Swimming
Mehdi Addadi – swimmer in the 2000 Summer Olympics in Sydney

Track and Field
Cleopatra Borel – track & field athlete competing in the 2016 Summer Olympics in Rio de Janeiro

References

University of Maryland, Baltimore County
University of Maryland, Baltimore County